Maianbar is a village on the outskirts of southern Sydney, in the state of New South Wales, Australia 29 kilometres south of the Sydney central business district. It is part of the Sutherland Shire.

Maianbar is adjacent to the village of Bundeena, less than kilometre away and linked by a bush track, and footbridge. It lies on the southern side of Port Hacking, opposite the suburbs of Burraneer, Dolans Bay, Port Hacking, Lilli Pilli and Cronulla. Maianbar is surrounded by the Royal National Park.

Name
Maianbar means deep tank or waterhole in the Gamilaraay language. The name initially referred to the site of local marine fish hatcheries and was probably chosen by the Trustees of the Royal National Park. Areas of today's suburb were known as Fishermans Bay Estate and Sand Spit Estate until 1951, when Sutherland Shire Council officially named it Maianbar.

Population
In the 2016 Census, there were 505 people in Maianbar.  83.0% of people were born in Australia and 93.4% of people spoke only English at home. The most common responses for religion were No Religion 45.0% and Catholic 25.0%.

Commercial area
There is a single shop in Maianbar which sells a small variety of goods. There is also a small community hall, Rural Fire Brigade station and local park.

Transport
Maianbar is quite an isolated village but can be accessed by road - a twenty-five-minute drive from Sutherland, or by ferry. There is an hourly commuter ferry service from Cronulla to Bundeena. Cabbage Tree Creek and 'The Basin' separate Bundeena from Maianbar. A bush track and footbridge link the two villages, which is approx 30mins walk. There is a road link between Bundeena and Maianbar, approx 9 km.

Maianbar Bundeena Bus Service operates bus route 989 for local bus services between Maianbar and Bundeena on school days only. In addition there is one return trip every Wednesday to Engadine and one return trip every Friday to Miranda both from Bundeena via Maianbar.

Art Trail
There are many artists in both Bundeena and Maianbar. The residents host a monthly art exhibition in local artists' houses, called the Art Trail. The Art Trail is held on the first Sunday of every month. Art Trail Website The Art Trail is free of charge and provides local artists with an opportunity to sell their artwork.

Environment
During early colonial settlement, Indonesian rusa deer were introduced and have since become a large population in the area. Many residents see the deer as pests, the National Parks & Wildlife Service and Council are permitted to cull. However many residents also take delight in the deer, which causes much division and emotion in the affected townships.

References

External links
 About Bundeena Maianbar

Suburbs of Sydney
Sutherland Shire